i amber (Chinese: 愛異想, Hanyu Pinyin: Ài Yìxiǎng) is Amber Kuo's second Chinese language album. On 3 July 2009, the celebration edition was released with a DVD.

Track listing
又圓了的月亮 You Yuan Le De Yue Liang (Another Full Moon) (04:52)
Love & Love (03:03)
天生一對 Tian Sheng Yi Dui (Ft. Nicholas Teo) (Perfect Match) (03:32)
你在，不在 Ni Zai, Bu Zai (You Are Here, Not Here) (04:23)
愛異想 Ai Yi Xiang (03:17)
Sorry對不起 Dui Bu Qi (03:36)
愛計較 Ai Ji Jiao (like To Haggle) (02:40)
Didadi的美  Didadi De Mei (Didadi Love) (03:42)
狠狠哭  Hen Hen Ku (Cry) (04:34)
Rain Won't Stay (03:49)

DVD
又圓了的月亮
你在，不在
愛異想
Rain Won't Stay
狠狠哭
Behind the Scenes of music video

References
Warner Music Online

2009 albums
Amber Kuo albums
Warner Music Taiwan albums